Joel Cheatwood is an American television executive.

Cheatwood served as news director at WSVN in Miami (the flagship station of Sunbeam Television) starting in 1989, soon after it had switched to Fox. Cheatwood was often criticized for an emphasis on sensationalistic reporting, but his  "7 News" format revived a station that had low ratings while it was an NBC affiliate and had a strong influence on what Fox stations' newscasts would eventually look like.

In 1993, Sunbeam Television bought WHDH-TV in Boston. Cheatwood relaunched the station with a considerably watered-down version of the WSVN format, which led to a ratings boost, especially after the longtime CBS affiliate switched to NBC in 1995. WHDH-TV, which later became an independent station in 2017, soon rose to second place in the Boston ratings, and for the last decade has regularly traded first place with long-dominant WCVB-TV.

In 1997, Cheatwood moved to WMAQ-TV in Chicago, an NBC O&O, as vice president of news and promotion.  Cheatwood was criticized for bringing Jerry Springer on as a commentator. The station's longtime anchor team, Carol Marin and Ron Magers, resigned in protest. Springer only made two commentaries before being let go, and station management later admitted that his hiring was a mistake. Cheatwood took the fall for the management's decision and was later moved to serve as a consultant for NBC.

In 1998, Cheatwood left NBC and became station manager for KYW-TV, the CBS owned-and-operated station in Philadelphia.  Two years later, he became the news director for WCBS-TV in New York City.  Also, Cheatwood doubled as executive vice president of news for all of CBS's O&Os. In August, he rebranded the station as the "CBS 2 Information Network," using "content partners" such as U.S. News & World Report and VH1.  He also moved most of the station's newscasts to the CBS Sports studio and renamed the 11pm newscast "Nightcast," giving it its own graphics and music.

During his tenure at WCBS-TV, Cheatwood was known for running the stations operations throughout the September 11, 2001 crisis, providing a sizable portion of footage that otherwise would have been unavailable. In February 2002 he opened a full-time news bureau in Jerusalem, Israel, hiring former CBS Radio reporter Kimberly Dozier as correspondent.

After finishing his contract with CBS, Cheatwood was hired as executive director of program development at CNN. At CNN Headline News, he worked on shows for Glenn Beck and Nancy Grace.

In April 2007, Cheatwood joined the Fox News Channel as Vice President of Development to focus on shows for Fox News Channel and the soon-to-be launched Fox Business Channel.

On April 6, 2011, Fox News's and Glenn Beck's syndicator, Mercury Radio Arts, announced that Joel Cheatwood would be leaving Fox News and would become an Executive Vice President for Mercury Radio Arts to work as the liaison between Beck and Fox News. He officially joined MRA on April 24, 2011.

On March 2, 2015, Cheatwood officially parted ways with TheBlaze.

References

External links
Joel Cheatwood collected coverage at the Los Angeles Times
Joel Cheatwood collected coverage at The New York Observer
Joel Cheatwood collected coverage at the NY Daily News

Blaze Media people
Living people
American television executives
Year of birth missing (living people)